Ekmečić is a Serbo-Croatian surname, derived from the word ekmečija, a Turkish loanword (ekmekci), meaning "bread maker" or "bread seller" (ekmek means "bread"). Its literal meaning is "the descendant of an ekmekci" or "little bread maker".

People with this surname:
 Ismet Ekmečić (born 1969), Slovenian footballer of Bosniak descent
 Milorad Ekmečić (born 1928-2015), Serbian historian, originally from Bosnia
 Savo Ekmečić (born 1948), Bosnian football goalkeeper

Sources 

Serbian surnames
Bosnian surnames
Occupational surnames